The European Centre for Minority Issues (ECMI) is a research institute based in Flensburg, Germany, that conducts research into minority-majority relations in Europe. ECMI is a non-partisan and interdisciplinary institution. It is a non-profit, independent foundation, registered according to German Civil Law.

ECMI was established in 1996 by the governments of Denmark, Germany and Schleswig-Holstein. The Centre is governed by a board composed of nine members: three from Denmark, three from Germany, one representative from the Organization for Security and Co-operation in Europe, one from the Council of Europe and one from the European Union. The institute's first director was Stefan Troebst, now Professor of East European Cultural Studies at the University of Leipzig.

His successor Professor Marc Weller led the Centre from 1999 until 2009. Today, he holds the Chair of International Law and International Constitutional Studies at the University of Cambridge. Professor Tove Malloy managed the institution from 2009 until 2019.

In 2019, the Executive Board of the European Centre for Minority Issues has named Professor Vello Pettai, as the new Director of the ECMI. Professor Pettai will take up his new position as ECMI Director on 1 March 2020.
The Centre employs a core staff and also hosts visiting fellows and visiting research associates.
The Centre organizes its activities around three principal themes. It is concerned with the evaluation and further development of universal, regional, bilateral and national standards that may assist in consolidating democratic governance on the basis of ethnic diversity and human rights. In this context, ECMI is also particularly interested in the emerging convergence of standards between EU members and applicant states. A second area of involvement relates to implementation procedures and mechanisms for these diverse standards and the study of their effectiveness. At times, ECMI has been invited to consider standards implementation and majority-minority relations in particular states in cooperation with the government of that state and local groups.

Publications

Over the years,the European Centre for Minority Issues has produced a number of Monographs, Reports, Working Papers and Issue Briefs,as well as the peer reviewed online open access journal, Journal on Ethnopolitics and Minority Issues  in Europe (JEMIE), in addition to co-editorship (with EURAC Bozen) of the flagship publication European Yearbook of Minority Issues. The goal of this publication effort is to increase the awareness and dissemination of topics on minority issues, as well as to encourage further research in this field.

See also
Council of Europe
Federal Union of European Nationalities
Minority Rights Group International
OSCE High Commissioner on National Minorities

References

External links
Home page

ECMI Kosovo
 http://www.ecmikosovo.org

ECMI Caucasus
 http://www.ecmicaucasus.org

JEMIE
 http://www.ecmi.de/publications/jemie

Human rights organisations based in Germany
Minority rights
Intergovernmental human rights organizations
Political research institutes